The Dalifoil & Thomas was a French automobile manufactured from 1896 until 1898.  A voiturette built in the Dulac factory in Montreuil-sous-Bois, it was powered by two separate De Dion engines.  In 1899 the company introduced a motor tricycle with a "Dust proof" two-speed constant-mesh gearbox.

See also
Dalifol, manufactured in 1896.

References
David Burgess Wise, The New Illustrated Encyclopedia of the Automobile

1890s cars
Defunct motor vehicle manufacturers of France
Cars introduced in 1896